Jackley is a surname. Notable people with the surname include:

Brock Jackley (born 1947), American politician in the state of Washington
Jessica Jackley (born 1977), American entrepreneur who co-founded Kiva and ProFounder
Marty Jackley (born 1970), American attorney and 30th Attorney General of South Dakota
Nat Jackley (1909–1988), English comic actor starring in variety, film and pantomime
Stephen Jackley, convicted British robber and author

See also
Ackley (disambiguation)
Jack (disambiguation)